Koppe armata is a species of spider of the genus Koppe. It is endemic to Sri Lanka.

See also 
 List of Liocranidae species

References

Liocranidae
Endemic fauna of Sri Lanka
Spiders of Asia
Spiders described in 1896